Tricholoma hordum is a mushroom of the agaric genus Tricholoma.

See also
List of North American Tricholoma

References

External links
 

Fungi described in 1821
Fungi of North America
hordum
Taxa named by Elias Magnus Fries